Tibor Stark (born 14 February 1972 in Tata, Komárom-Esztergom) is a retired male weightlifter from Hungary. He competed for his native country in three consecutive Summer Olympics, starting in 1992 (Barcelona, Spain). A European champion in 1997, he ended up in 8th place in 1996 and 2000 in the men's superheavyweight division (+ 105 kg).

Major results

References

 sports-reference

1972 births
Living people
Hungarian male weightlifters
Weightlifters at the 1992 Summer Olympics
Weightlifters at the 1996 Summer Olympics
Weightlifters at the 2000 Summer Olympics
Olympic weightlifters of Hungary